Elkhorn Township, Nebraska may refer to:

 Elkhorn Township, Cuming County, Nebraska
 Elkhorn Township, Dodge County, Nebraska

See also
Elkhorn Township (disambiguation)

Nebraska township disambiguation pages